The Freedom Fighter's Manual is a fifteen-page propaganda booklet that was manufactured by the United States Central Intelligence Agency and airdropped over Nicaragua in 1983, with the stated goal of providing a "Practical guide to liberating Nicaragua from oppression and misery by paralyzing the military-industrial complex of the traitorous marxist state". The manual explains several methods by which the average citizen could cause civil disorder. A Contra fighter gave the manual to a U.S. reporter in Honduras in 1984.

Contents 

The publication describes many ways in which the average citizen could disrupt the everyday workings of the government. It begins with actions that require little to no risk at all, such as hiding or destroying important tools, calling in sick for work, and leaving lights and faucets on. It then progresses to instruct people to steal food from the government, release livestock from farming cooperatives, make false reports of fires and crimes, and sever telephone lines. Four pages are devoted to disabling vehicles. By the end of the pamphlet, there are detailed diagrams showing how to make Molotov cocktails and use them to firebomb police stations.

See also 
 CIA activities in Nicaragua
 Iran–Contra affair

 Oliver North
 Nicaragua v. United States
 Psychological warfare
 Psychological Operations in Guerrilla Warfare
 U.S. Army and CIA interrogation manuals
 U.S. Army Field Manual 30-31B
 United States involvement in regime change

References

External links 
 The Freedom Fighter's Manual (Full Copy in Spanish with English Translation)
The Freedom Fighter's Manual (Copy in Russian Translation)
The Freedom Fighter's Manual - battling communist rule, nicaragua.com
 How to "Neutralize" the Enemy by Evan Thomas, Ross H. Munro, and Martin Casey in Time magazine, October 29, 1984

Central Intelligence Agency publications
Contras
Guerrilla warfare handbooks and manuals
1983 non-fiction books
Nicaragua–United States relations
American propaganda during the Cold War
Nicaraguan Revolution